was a town located in Nakakoma District, Yamanashi Prefecture, Japan.

As of 2003, the town had an estimated population of 40,969 and a density of 3,200.70 persons per km2. The total area was 12.80 km2.

On September 1, 2004, Ryūō, along with the town of Futaba (from Kitakoma District) and the town of Shikishima (also from Nakakoma District), was merged to create the city of Kai.

Photographs of the skyline were used as temporary backdrops for the unfinished video game , which would eventually become Super Smash Bros..

External links
Official website of Kai city 

Dissolved municipalities of Yamanashi Prefecture
Kai, Yamanashi